The Battle of Poimanenon or Poemanenum was fought in early 1224 (or possibly late 1223) between the forces of the two main successor states of the Byzantine Empire; the Latin Empire and the Byzantine Greek Empire of Nicaea. The opposing forces met at Poimanenon, south of Cyzicus in Mysia, near Lake Kuş.

Background and battle
Since the Treaty of Nymphaeum in 1214, the Latin Empire had controlled the northwestern littoral of Asia Minor, from Nicomedia to Adramyttium, as well as the Mysian plain. In November 1221, the energetic founder of the Nicaean Empire, Theodore I Laskaris, died, and was succeeded by his son-in-law, John III Doukas Vatatzes, who had emerged as the victor out of the civil strife that had commenced since the death of Theodore I Laskaris. The succession was disputed by Theodore's brothers, the sebastokratores Alexios Laskaris and Isaac Laskaris, who rose up in revolt and requested the aid of the Latin emperor, Robert of Courtenay. At the head of a Latin army, they marched against Vatatzes. The two armies met at Poimanenon, near a church dedicated to the Archangel Michael. In the ensuing battle, Vatatzes achieved a decisive victory; among the captives taken were the two Laskaris brothers, who were blinded.

Aftermath
Summing up the importance of this battle, the 13th-century Byzantine historian George Akropolites wrote that "Since then (this battle), the state of the Italians [the Latin Empire] ... began to decline". 

The news about the defeat at Poimanenon caused panic in the Latin imperial army besieging Serres from the Despotate of Epirus, which withdrew in chaos in the direction of Constantinople and was therefore defeated decisively by the troops of the Epirote ruler, Theodore Komnenos Doukas. This victory opened up the way for the recovery of most of the Latin possessions in Asia. Threatened both by Nicaea in Asia and Epirus in Europe, the Latin emperor sued for peace, which was concluded in 1225. According to its terms, the Latins abandoned all their Asian possessions except for the eastern shore of the Bosporus and the city of Nicomedia with the surrounding region.

References

Sources
 
 
 
 
 

1224 in Asia
Battles in medieval Anatolia
Battles involving the Empire of Nicaea
Battles involving the Latin Empire
Conflicts in 1224
Byzantine Mysia
History of Balıkesir Province